Erik King (born April 21, 1963) is an American actor, best known for his portrayal of Sergeant James Doakes on Showtime's television series Dexter. He is also known for his roles as Moses Deyell on Oz., and as Bobby Davidson in Missing Persons.

Early life
King, whose father was a policeman, attended The Duke Ellington High School of Performing Arts in Washington, DC and later Towson University, Baltimore MD.

Career
Early roles for King were in TV series such as Matlock, NYPD Blue and JAG.  In 1990, he starred in the short-lived ABC police drama Sunset Beat. He appeared as Moses Deyell in HBO's television series Oz. Other episodic work includes Malcolm In The Middle, Charmed and CSI: Miami. King appeared on The District as Travis Hayward, as well as CBS' Touched by an Angel.

King has appeared in multiple feature films, including the adventure film National Treasure and the thriller Desperate Measures.

King's prominence rose with his role as police detective James Doakes in the Showtime TV series Dexter. He starred in 24 episodes from the pilot in 2006 to the last episode of Season 2 in 2007. For his portrayal as the main antagonist of the show, he received a Saturn Award nomination in 2008 for Best Supporting Actor on Television. He said of his role that:
What I love about Sgt. Doakes is that when you run into a cop, a lot of them are fair, even-minded guys; but there are a lot of guys who are hard-asses and I love the fact that I get to play it.

He was a spokesman for Michelin tyres.

Filmography

Film

Television

References

External links

 
 Biography for Erik King at Showtime (archived link)

Male actors from Washington, D.C.
African-American male actors
American male film actors
American male stage actors
American male television actors
Living people
Place of birth missing (living people)
1963 births
Morehouse College alumni
21st-century African-American people
20th-century African-American people